Bajo Boquete   is a corregimiento in Boquete District, Chiriquí Province, Panama. It is the seat of Boquete District. Its population as of 1990 was 10,908; its population as of 2000 was 3,833.

References

Corregimientos of Chiriquí Province

es:Bajo Boquete